Michael H. Conlin (born July 11, 1943) is a former member of the Michigan House of Representatives.

Early life
Conlin was born in Detroit on July 11, 1943.

Career
On November 5, 1974, Conlin was elected to the Michigan House of Representatives where he represented the 23rd district from January 8, 1975 to 1978. Conlin unsuccessfully ran for the United States House of Representatives seat representing Michigan's 6th district in 1978.

Personal life
Conlin was a member of the Disabled American Veterans. Conlin was Catholic.

References

Living people
1943 births
Politicians from Detroit
Catholics from Michigan
Republican Party members of the Michigan House of Representatives
20th-century American politicians